Sung Lee, professionally known as SungBeats, is a beatboxer, live looper, and former busker based in NYC. He is best known for winning Amateur Night at the Apollo (2014), and the American Beatbox Championships, Loopstation (2018).

Background 
SungBeats was born in South Korea but immigrated to the United States when he was 9 years old. He first discovered the art of beatboxing by watching a video of Tampa's beatbox EFFEX when he was 13. Despite being discouraged by his peers, he continued to pursue beatboxing and won the annual talent show at Leonia High School as a freshman. Sung studied Psychology at Rutgers University and performed at various open mics and social events on campus. Prior to embarking on his music career, he worked as an office manager in Las Vegas.

Professional career 
SungBeats quit his job to perform in the subways of NYC when he was 23. A year later, he won Amateur Night at the Apollo (2014) and Kollaboration, the premiere Asian American talent contest in the United States. Since, SungBeats has been a vocal advocate for Asian-American representation in mainstream media. In 2015, he shifted his musical focus from solo beatboxing to live vocal looping, recognizing that live instrumentation was the future of the art form. The same year, he became the first American to represent at the Grand Beatbox Battle, Loopstation category, placing 8th. In 2016, Sung partnered with Defy Ventures and toured maximum security prisons, including Solano State Prison and Riker's Island. In 2017, Sung's work as a busker in the New York City underground was featured in various news outlets. In 2021, SungBeats appeared on several national commercials including Mars Wrigley's M&Ms Mix commercial. He currently tours and performs his combination beatbox and looping show all over the United States.

Musical Style 
SungBeats is best known for his live-looping and ability to layer precise vocals to replicate covers. Stylistically, he has embraced music of all genres ranging from hip hop, EDM, and house. Sung has credited some of his early beatbox influences to be Rahzel, Kenny Muhammad, and FaithSFX. In terms of equipment, he uses the Roland RC-505 MKI to layer and sample his vocals in real time, and is a frequent user of the IOS app Loopy HD for vocal production.

Competitions

References 

1989 births
Living people